The 1956 SFR Yugoslavia Chess Championship was the 11th edition of SFR Yugoslav Chess Championship. Held in Skopje, SFR Yugoslavia, SR Macedonia. The tournament was won by Svetozar Gligorić.

References

External links 

Yugoslav Chess Championships
1956 in chess
Chess